VEBA may mean:

VEBA AG a German utility
Voluntary employees' beneficiary association